Peter Lang (born 29 January 1963) is a German Olympic sailor in the Flying Dutchman class. He crewed for Albert Batzill and finished eight in the 1988 Summer Olympics and fifth in the 1992 edition.

References

1963 births
German male sailors (sport)
Olympic sailors of West Germany
Olympic sailors of Germany
Flying Dutchman class sailors
Soling class sailors
Sailors at the 1988 Summer Olympics – Flying Dutchman
Sailors at the 1992 Summer Olympics – Flying Dutchman
Living people
Flying Dutchman class world champions
World champions in sailing for Germany